Thomas Dean Stray (born  18 January 1987) is a professional cricketer, representing the South Australia cricket team. He played in the 2006 Under-19 Cricket World Cup in Sri Lanka.

References

External links

1987 births
Living people
Australian cricketers
Victoria cricketers
South Australia cricketers
Place of birth missing (living people)
21st-century Australian people